Robert Bliss Wilkinson (1838 – 26 April 1928) was an English-born Australian politician.

He was born in Northampton to engineer David Wilkinson and Elizabeth Bliss. He attended Hanwell College before migrating to Victoria in 1852. From 1853 he worked for the Castlemaine and Maryborough branches of the Bank of Victoria. He ran a station near Wagga Wagga from 1865 in partnership with J.S. Lavender; they sold out after a few years and became stock agents in 1870, running out of Sydney, Hay, Wagga Wagga and Bourke. On 15 November 1882 he married Alice Georgiana Foss Jarrett; they had no children, but a second marriage on 26 February 1890 to Annie Louise Leitch (née Lavender) resulted in three children.  Robert Bliss and Annie Louisa Wilkinson are buried directly alongside Alice Georgiana Foss Wilkinson behind St. Thomas' church in South Strathfield (formerly known as Enfield).

In 1880 he was elected to the New South Wales Legislative Assembly for Balranald. A Free Trader, he held his seat until his retirement in 1894. In 1901 he became managing director of Wilkinson & Lavender, retiring in 1927. Wilkinson died at Strathfield the following year.

References

 

1838 births
1928 deaths
Members of the New South Wales Legislative Assembly
Free Trade Party politicians